Jacques Ekangue Tabi (born 22 January 1988) is a Cameroonian footballer playing last with FK Hajduk Kula in the Serbian SuperLiga.

Club career
He played in Cameroon with Douala AC and Sable FC before moving to the United Arab Emirates and play with Al Ahli Club (Dubai) during 2012.  During the winter break of the 2012–13 season he moved to Serbia and signed with FK Hajduk Kula.  He made his debut in the SuperLiga on April 3, 2013, in an away match against Red Star Belgrade.

National team
Tabi was part of the Cameroon U-20 national team that played in the 2007 CAN juniors tournament.

Two years later, he would be part of the Cameroon national team in a preparation match against R.D. Congo for the 2009 African Nations Championship.

References

1989 births
Living people
Footballers from Douala
Cameroonian footballers
Cameroonian expatriate footballers
Association football midfielders
Sable FC players
Al Ahli Club (Dubai) players
Expatriate footballers in the United Arab Emirates
FK Hajduk Kula players
Serbian SuperLiga players
Expatriate footballers in Serbia
Douala Athletic Club players
Cameroon under-20 international footballers